İsenbike is a Turkish given name. It comprises İsen and Büke (origin of Bike). In Turkish, "İsen" means "wise" and "Büke" means "queen" and "woman". Thus making it "Wise Queen".
In Bashir and Tatar language "Isen" means "living", "live", "alive" and "Bike" means "woman", "lady".

Real People

 İsenbike Togan, professor of history at the Middle East Technical University and daughter of Zeki Velidi Togan.

Turkish feminine given names